This is a list of members of the Victorian Legislative Assembly from 1964 to 1967, as elected at the 1964 state election:

 On 9 July 1965, the Liberal member for Caulfield, Alexander Fraser, died. Liberal candidate Ian McLaren won the resulting by-election on 18 September 1965.
 On 19 August 1966, the Labor member for Grant, Roy Crick, died. Labor candidate Jack Ginifer won the resulting by-election on 8 October 1966.

Members of the Parliament of Victoria by term
20th-century Australian politicians